Anthony Watson (February 5, 1941 – March 9, 2021) was an American athlete. He competed in the men's long jump at the 1960 Summer Olympics.

References

External links
 

1941 births
2021 deaths
Athletes (track and field) at the 1960 Summer Olympics
American male long jumpers
Olympic track and field athletes of the United States
Place of birth missing